Marcus Joseph Sieff, Baron Sieff of Brimpton OBE (2 July 1913 – 23 February 2001) was a British businessman and chairman of his family company, the retailer Marks & Spencer, from 1972 to 1982. Like his parents, he was also a leading figure in UK Zionism.

Life
Sieff was born in Didsbury, Manchester, the second son of Rebecca Sieff and Israel Sieff. He was educated at Manchester Grammar School, St Paul's and Corpus Christi College, Cambridge. Starting work for the family company in Hammersmith, London in 1935, Sieff first visited Mandatory Palestine in 1939. He joined the Royal Artillery in the British Army at the outbreak of World War II and received an OBE in 1944 for gallant service. Exiting the British Army with the rank of colonel, he returned to Marks & Spencer, but was asked in 1948 by the first Prime Minister of Israel, David Ben-Gurion, to become an adviser on transportation and supplies to the Israeli Defence ministry. Sieff joined the Israel Defense Forces and helped co-ordinate Marks & Spencer goods and finances to support the new state.

Sieff was knighted in 1971 and was created a life peer on 14 February 1980 as Baron Sieff of Brimpton, of Brimpton in the Royal County of Berkshire. Married four times, Sieff's fourth wife was a Polish widow, Lily Moretzki (née Spatz), whom he married in London in 1963. She ran most of his charitable associations and then nursed him during his final years. One of his sons Sir David Sieff served on the board of Marks & Spencers for many years.

Arms

References

1913 births
2001 deaths
Alumni of Corpus Christi College, Cambridge
British Army personnel of World War II
British businesspeople in retailing
Conservative Party (UK) life peers
English Jews
English people of Lithuanian-Jewish descent
Israeli soldiers
Knights Bachelor
Officers of the Order of the British Empire
People educated at Manchester Grammar School
People from Didsbury
Royal Artillery officers
The Independent people
Marcus
Sons of life peers
Jewish British politicians
People from West Berkshire District
20th-century English businesspeople
Sieff
Life peers created by Elizabeth II